Michael (Mike) Kipsugut Boit (born 6 January 1949) is a Kenyan former professional middle-distance athlete whose career spanned fifteen years. He is a professor at Kenyatta University in the Department of Exercise and Sports Science. He is an uncle to Philip Boit, who became the first Kenyan athlete to compete in the Winter Olympics.

Education
Boit graduated from St. Patrick's High School in Iten in 1969, a school well known for having produced such world class distance runners as Matthew Birir, David Rudisha, Wilson Kipketer, Japheth Kimutai and many others. Boit received a Diploma from Kenyatta College (now Kenyatta University) in 1972, a bachelor's degree from Eastern New Mexico University in 1976, two master's degrees from Stanford University in 1977 and 1978, and a Doctoral of Education Degree from the University of Oregon in 1986. In 2014, Boit received an honorary Doctorate of Science (DSc) from the University of Glasgow in recognition of his contributions to the academic research of sports and its development in Kenya.

Teaching and Administration 
Boit joined the Kenyatta University as a full-time faculty member in 1987. From 1990 to 1997, Boit took leave of his position at the University to work as the Kenya Commissioner of Sports; Boit returned to Kenyatta University in 1998.

During the 1990s, Boit also stayed active in the athletic community as member of the IAAF Athletes Commission from 1989 to 1999 and the Special Olympics from 1992–1995.

In 2004, Boit and his friend John Manners, whom he met while in high school when Manners was in the Peace Corps, founded KENSAP, The Kenya Scholar-Athlete Project. The Project helps bright students from under-served regions of Kenya gain admission to elite colleges in the United States. Boit and Manners have currently successfully placed more than 100 students in top American universities, including Harvard, MIT, Princeton, Duke, Wesleyan, Brown, Cornell, Amherst, Yale, Barnard, Carleton, Oberlin, Dartmouth, UPenn, Wellesley, Bates, Colby, Tufts, Middlebury, Brandeis, Williams, and Hamilton.

Athletics career

Representing St. Patrick's – Iten, Boit won the Kenya national high school title in the 800 metres in 1969. He later went on to win the 800 metres bronze medal at the 1972 Munich Olympics, in a race better known for the last-to-first comeback kick by US Olympian Dave Wottle.  Boit also earned a fourth-place finish in the 1500 metres behind fellow legendary Kenyan runner Kipchoge Keino.

A Kenya boycott of the 1976 Montreal Olympics and 1980 Moscow Olympics denied Boit a second chance for Olympic glory. Boit however remained one of the world’s top middle distance runners throughout the 1970s winning the 800 metres silver medal at the 1974 Commonwealth Games and a silver medal at the 1977 World Cup of Athletics in a much anticipated face-off against the 1976 Olympic gold medalist Alberto Juantorena of Cuba. He finished 2nd at the 1977 IAAF World Cup 800 metres race.

Boit won the gold at the 1978 Commonwealth Games and a bronze in the 1500 metres at the 1982 Commonwealth Games. He won the 1500 metres at the 1st African Championships in 1979. In Sebastian Coe's record breaking Summer of 81 Boit could often be seen lurking at Coe's shoulder in 1500 metre and mile races, pushing him all the way to the line as the records tumbled. In 1983 Boit ran a downhill mile in 3:28.36, the then fastest mile in history. This did not count as the world record because of the course's downhill grade. Boit ended his athletic career in 1990 breaking the Masters Division Indoor World Record for the mile in Meadowlands, New Jersey.

References

External links 

 
 
 

1949 births
Living people
Athletes (track and field) at the 1972 Summer Olympics
Kenyan male middle-distance runners
Olympic athletes of Kenya
Olympic bronze medalists for Kenya
Athletes (track and field) at the 1982 Commonwealth Games
Athletes (track and field) at the 1978 Commonwealth Games
Athletes (track and field) at the 1974 British Commonwealth Games
Commonwealth Games gold medallists for Kenya
Commonwealth Games silver medallists for Kenya
Commonwealth Games bronze medallists for Kenya
Commonwealth Games medallists in athletics
Medalists at the 1972 Summer Olympics
Olympic bronze medalists in athletics (track and field)
People from Uasin Gishu County
Medallists at the 1974 British Commonwealth Games
Medallists at the 1978 Commonwealth Games
Medallists at the 1982 Commonwealth Games